Årsjö is a Swedish surname. Notable people with the surname include:
Johannes Årsjö (born 1985), Swedish strongman
Ebba Årsjö (born 2001), Swedish para alpine skier

Swedish-language surnames